The Sundering may refer to:

 The Sundering (Dungeons & Dragons), a fictional event set in the Forgotten Realms
 The Sundering (novel), a novel by Walter Jon Williams
 The Sundering (series), a series of novels by Jacqueline Carey
 "The Sundering", a song by the Sword from the album Gods of the Earth